Sidney Rankin Drew (September 19, 1891May 19, 1918) was an American actor and film director.

Biography
Born in 1891, Drew was the son of Mr. and Mrs. Sidney Drew and first cousin of the actors John Barrymore, Lionel Barrymore, and Ethel Barrymore. He appeared in 36 films between 1913 and 1917, and directed 14 films between 1915 and 1917.

After a successful career with Vitagraph, Drew moved to Metro Pictures in 1916, becoming the fifth of the Barrymore/Drew to work at the studio. His first, and last, film at Metro was The Belle of the Season, which was shot in 1916, but released posthumously in 1918.

Drew was killed in action when his plane was shot down over France during World War I. He was originally buried in France but reinterred at Mount Vernon Cemetery in Philadelphia, Pennsylvania. He has a monument in Central Park.

Partial filmography
 Mr. Barnes of New York (1914, actor)
 In the Latin Quarter (1915, actor)
 The Suspect (1916, director and actor)
 The Girl Philippa (1917,  director and actor)
 Who's Your Neighbor? (1917, director)
 The Belle of the Season (released 1919 although shot in 1917, director, scenario, and actor)

See also
 Barrymore family

References

External links

Biography, Photoplay, April 1917

Life and Letters of Sidney Rankin Drew (1921), edited by Mrs. Sidney Drew, at the Internet Archive

1891 births
1918 deaths
American film directors
American male silent film actors
American military personnel killed in World War I
Sidney Rankin Drew
Burials at Mount Vernon Cemetery (Philadelphia)
Male actors from New York City
United States Army Air Service pilots of World War I
20th-century American male actors
People from Manhattan